Portage Lakes State Park is a public recreation area located around the Portage Lakes in New Franklin, Ohio, in the United States. The eight Portage Lakes encompass  used for boating, fishing, and swimming. The Ohio Department of Public Works turned over maintenance of the lakes to the Ohio Department of Natural Resources Division of Parks and Recreation in 1949.

References

External links
Portage Lakes State Park Ohio Department of Natural Resources 
Portage Lakes State Park Map Ohio Department of Natural Resources 

State parks of Ohio
Protected areas of Summit County, Ohio
Protected areas established in 1949
1949 establishments in Ohio